The Second Railroad Car No. 21, at the Nevada State Railroad Museum, located at 2180 S. Carson St. in Carson City, Nevada is a historic railroad car of the Virginia & Truckee line that was built in 1907.
It was built by the American Car & Foundry.  It was listed on the National Register of Historic Places in 1978.

References 

National Register of Historic Places in Carson City, Nevada
Railway vehicles on the National Register of Historic Places in Nevada
Virginia and Truckee Railroad